This is a list of rail accidents from 1990 to 1999.

1990
 January 4 – Pakistan – Sukkur rail disaster: A Multan–Karachi Bahauddin Zakaria Express collides head-on with an empty 67-car freight train at Sangi station, Sukkur, Sindh; the train was to pass through Sangi, but incorrectly set rail points direct the train to a siding where the freight train is parked; 307 people are killed and another 700 more injured in Pakistan's worst rail disaster.
 February 2 – West Germany – Rüsselsheim train disaster: Two S-Bahn commuter trains collide in Rüsselsheim, killing 17 and injuring 80.
 February 16 – Switzerland – A passenger train collides with a rail-mounted crane at Saxon. Three people are killed and twelve are injured.
 March 7 – United States – 1990 Philadelphia subway accident: A bolt securing a traction motor on a SEPTA subway-elevated train fails, causing the train to derail. Three people are killed and 150 injured.
 May 6 – Australia – Cowan rail accident: The 3801 Limited special steam passenger train stalls while climbing a steep gradient from the Hawkesbury River to Cowan. While stopped, it is struck in the rear by a CityRail inter-urban passenger train, killing six people. Sand applied to the rails interfered with track signals and had given the CityLine train a false clear indication.
 August 20 – Poland – Ursus rail crash:  At 06:20 local time, a passenger train called Silesia – from Prague to Warsaw – telescopes last car of passenger train from Szklarska Poręba to Warsaw, killing 16, injuring 43. Cause of crash is unknown (probably signalling fault)
 December 12 – United States – Back Bay rail accident: Amtrak's Night Owl, the Northeast Corridor's overnight train, travelling at excessive speed around a curve inside a tunnel, derails and crashes into the rear of an MBTA commuter train in Back Bay station in Boston, Massachusetts.  This accident injured 453 people (although no-one was killed), and was so severe that the locomotives of both trains along with several coaches had to be scrapped on site.
 December 20 – Taiwan – A Kaohsiung-Taipei express train collides at level crossing at Lu Chu, Kaohsiung with a bus carrying 51 farmers returning from travelling which bursts into flames, killing 25 people, and injuring 32.

1991
 January 7 – Hungary – A three-car tram No. 1342 (Ganz bendytram) operated by BKV derails and overturns in Budapest at the corner of Vajda Péter utca and Orczy út due to an unintentional point switching by the tram driver. Four people are killed including a pedestrian.
 May 14 – Japan – Shigaraki train disaster, Shigaraki, Shiga: A Shigaraki Kōgen Railway (SKR) passenger train collides head-on with a JR West passenger train after the SKR train passes a red signal; 42 people are killed. A malfunctioning signal gave the JR West train a green signal, when the approaching SKR train should have turned the signal to red. Confusion among SKR staff stemming from the signal problems prompted them to send the train against a red signal.
 July 15 – United States – Dunsmuir, California – California's largest hazardous chemical spill: A 19,000-gallon (72,000 L) tank railroad car containing the pesticide/herbicide metam sodium derails from a northbound Southern Pacific freight train, tumbling off the bridge over the Sacramento River at the Cantara Loop, and rupturing on the rocks below, spilling the car's entire load into the river. Virtually every aquatic organism on a 40-mile (64 km) stretch of river was killed.
 July 21 – United Kingdom – Glasgow: Newton rail accident kills 4 and injures 22. Junction layout cited as a contributing factor.
 July 29 – United States – Seacliff, Ventura, California: A Southern Pacific freight train carrying hazardous chemicals derails in the Ventura County coastal community of Seacliff. Four of the 14 railroad cars that spilled off the tracks were carrying two types of chemicals: a half-strength aqueous hydrazine solution used to make agricultural, metal plating, plastics and photo processing chemicals; and naphthalene, an industrial solvent for making other chemicals. 
 July 31 – United States – Lugoff, South Carolina: The Amtrak Silver Star derails the rear portion of its consist on the former Seaboard Air Line of the CSXT Railroad when a faulty switch splits (moves out of position) as the train passes over it, directing a coach into a hopper car standing on a siding, and derailing equipment. Eight passengers die and 76 are injured.
 August 5 – Canada – Kinsella, Alberta: A CN consist (5300, 5130, 5418) heading westbound pulling an intermodal train strikes a truck carrying light crude oil at a marked highway crossing. The impact does not derail the train, but does ignite the crude oil and causes significant damage to the entire train. The three train crew members and truck driver were all killed.
 August 26 – United States – Downers Grove, Illinois: Mary T. Wojtyla, 41, of Chicago died on impact when she was hit by a westbound Metra/Burlington Northern EMD E9 pulling a "Racetrack" express train, estimated to be traveling at 60 miles per hour (100 km/h). The accident occurred at the Fairview Avenue grade crossing/Fairview Station. She crossed the center track and was struck and killed instantly. Her lawyer saw the oncoming train and was not struck. Accident was caught on tape by railfan's camera and an edited version cutting out the moment of impact is often used by Operation Lifesaver for training purposes.
 August 28 – United States – New York City: 1991 Union Square derailment - Five people are killed and more than 200 injured when a #4 Lexington Avenue express train derails going over a switch just north of Union Square. Two subway cars break open as they strike the steel tunnel support beams. The uninjured motorman, who passengers report had been handling the train erratically, flees the scene and is arrested later, testing out as legally drunk. This accident, coupled with the Amtrak Colonial wreck at Chase, Maryland on January 4, 1987, is instrumental in driving new federal rules for engineer certification and toxicology testing.
 September 6 – Republic of the Congo – More than 100 people are killed after a passenger train from Pointe Noire collides head-on with a goods train carrying timber from Brazzaville.
 October 16 – France – . A freight train overruns a closed signal, and fouls the path of the Nice-Paris night train at Melun. 16 people are killed. The accident was caused by a heart attack suffered by the freight train engineer. The deadman mechanism worked perfectly, but it was too late to stop the train in time. This led to the adoption of the KVB automatic train control system which will detect improper train handling.
 November 15 – Taiwan – 1991 Miaoli train collision - One northbound Tze-Chiang Train (the first-rank limited express service in Taiwan) runs over the stop signal and rear-ends a southbound Chukuang train (also a type of limited express service but with lower rank). Thirty people die and 112 are injured. The ATS system in the Tze-Chuang train was not working.
 December 7 – United Kingdom – Severn Tunnel rail accident - An InterCity 125 diesel multiple unit is hit from behind by a Class 155 Sprinter inside the Severn Tunnel, injuring 185 people.

1992
 March 3 – Russia – Podsosenka train disaster: Yurmala passenger train No. 004 runs a red light at a restrictive signal and collides head-on with oncoming freight train No. 3455. A fire erupts that spreads to the passenger cars, killing 43 people and injuring 108. The crash is the first in post-Soviet Russia.
 March 12 – Sweden – 1992 Gothenburg tram accident. An unmanned tram rolls down a street in central Gothenburg at high speed and crashes into waiting passengers at a tram stop at Vasaplatsen, killing 13 people.
 August 8 – Switzerland – A train and a tram collide at Zurich. One person is killed and nine are injured.
 April 29 – United States – at Bell King Road in Newport News, Virginia, a crossing without gates or warning lights, Amtrak's Colonial passenger train collides with a dump truck carrying sand.  The driver of the truck is killed by the collision, and fifty-four passengers are injured in the ensuing derailment.  Witnesses allege that the train's engineer failed to sound his horn until two seconds before the collision. The estate of the truck driver later sues the railroad, and the case is settled for an undisclosed amount after three days of trial.
 June 30 – United States– Nemadji River train derailment: near Superior, Wisconsin, a Burlington Northern freight train derails on a trestle, spilling benzene into the Nemadji River, releasing a toxic vapor which causes deaths of wild animals and outside pets.
Though there are no fatalities, dozens are injured. Sixty of the passengers subsequently sue Amtrak and CSX (who owned the right-of-way) for negligence, but the case is decided in favor of the railroad companies as it was determined that there was no way for the train crew to prevent the incident. The two men (Joseph Loomis and his accomplice, fellow Coast Guardsman Raymond Bornman Jr. ) were sentenced to federal prison terms for the crime.
 October 10 - South Africa –  A steam passenger train running during the Lady Grey Spring Festival derails at high speed killing the engine driver and 5 passengers.
 October 11 – China – Liaoning, Fushun – the DF4C diesel locomotive No. 4031 and 4045 locomotives of the Shenyang Railway Bureau Meihekou locomotive depot were reconnected to pull a freight train through the Shenyang - Jilin Railway to approach the Shimenling railway station and prepare to stop the 323 passenger train from Tianjin railway station to Jilin railway station, because one of the corner cock of the train was closed, the train brake failed. To avoid train collision, the freight train derailed and overturned after entering the safety siding of Shimenling railway station. The accident resulted in the death of four locomotive attendants, the interruption of train operation for 10 hours and 25 minutes, the scrapping of two DF 4C diesel locomotives, and no loss of 323 passenger trains.
 November 15 – Germany – eleven people die and fifty-two are injured when the wreckage of a derailed freight train is hit by an express train near Northeim.
 November 30 – Netherlands – Hoofddorp train accident: An Intercity train, travelling from Amsterdam to Vlissingen derails near Hoofddorp. Five people die, and thirty-three are injured.

1993
 January 31 – Kenya – along the Ngai Ndethya River near Mtito Andei: A Kenya Railways train which was traveling from Mombasa to Nairobi derails due to flooding from the nearby river. 140 people die. 
 March 17 – United States – near Fort Lauderdale, Florida: An Amtrak train collides with a gasoline tanker truck that had become trapped on the tracks due to traffic congestion. The driver of the truck and 5 nearby motorists are killed in the resulting fireballs.
 March 28 – South Korea – a Mugunghwa-ho train in the vicinity of Gupo station in Busan rolls over due to subsidence under a section of track caused by nearby construction. Seventy-eight people are killed and another 198 injured, making it the worst rail accident in South Korea.
 September 22 – United States – Big Bayou Canot rail accident, near Mobile, Alabama: Barges being pushed by an off-course towboat collide with a bridge piling; the bridge shifts out of alignment, creating a kink in the rails on the CSXT's former Louisville & Nashville Gulfcoast line. Minutes later, Amtrak's Sunset Limited derails at high speed on the misaligned track and plunges into the water, causing an enormous fuel spill and fire. Forty-seven people are killed in Amtrak's deadliest accident.
 November 11 – United States – near Kelso, Washington: A Union Pacific and a Burlington Northern freight train (having 83 wagons and 110 wagons respectively) collide head-on, because the Burlington Northern train had failed to stop for a red signal, which was likely missed due to dense fog, killing the 5 crew members on board both trains. Due to this incident, the two railroads implemented new safety features called "Precision Train Control" (an ancestor to the later federally mandated, Positive Train Control) on 750 miles (1200 km) of UP and BN track.

1994
 January 13 - United States - In Pasco County, Florida, A Barnum & Bailey circus train carrying circus members derailed due to a track failure. The train also caught on fire, two people were killed.
 March 8 – Switzerland – a freight train derails at Zurich. A tank wagon carrying petrol explodes, injuring three people.
 March 9 – South Africa – A commuter train with eight cars carrying 800 passengers is derailed in a suburb of Durban, KwaZulu-Natal, killing at least 63 people, injuring another 370, resulting as one of South Africa's deadliest rail disasters.
 March 21 – Switzerland – The side of a passenger train from Brig to Romanshorn is ripped out by a crane wagon at Däniken. Nine people are killed.
 May 16 – United States – Amtrak's Silver Meteor passenger train, bound from New York to Florida, derailed near Selma, North Carolina after hitting a cargo container jutting out from a passing freight. The Amtrak engineer was killed and nearly 100 passengers were injured.
 June 25 – United Kingdom – Greenock rail crash, Scotland: Two people are killed when a train strikes concrete blocks that were placed on the track by vandals.
 August 3 – United States – The westbound Lake Shore Limited, operated by Amtrak, derailed on Conrail tracks in Batavia, New York. The accident occurred at 3:44 am. Luckily, there were no deaths, but 108 passengers and 10 crew members were injured. Of the 18 cars on the train, 14 derailed and had serious damage. Cars 8–12 on the consist fell down an embankment.
 September 29 – Germany – Two passenger trains collide head-on near Bad Bramstedt, resulting in the deaths of six people and injuring 67.
 October 15 – United Kingdom – Cowden rail crash – Two trains collide head-on in Cowden, Kent, after a driver runs through a red signal; 5 people are killed and 12 injured.
 November 20 – Canada – VIA Rail train No. 66, travelling eastward at approximately 155 km/h (96 mph), struck a piece of rail intentionally placed on the track at Mile 242.07 of the CN North America (CN) Kingston Subdivision, in Brighton, Ontario. The piece of rail punctured a locomotive fuel tank and severed electrical power cables creating electrical arcing which ignited the leaking fuel. A fire erupted and the trailing portion of the locomotive and the first two-passenger cars behind the locomotive became engulfed in flames. Forty-six of the 385 passengers were injured.
 December 2 – Hungary – Szajol – A train going to Budapest derails after it passes through a false switch at 110 km/h. It collided with a station building, killing 31 people and injuring 52 more. It was the second-worst rail incident in post-World War II Hungary, after the 1968 Mende rail disaster, which killed 64 people. 
 December 14 – United States - San Bernardino, California – A Santa Fe intermodal train rear-ends a Union Pacific coal train at Cajon Pass due to a kink in the air hose that triggers the brakes, injuring 2 crewmembers who are forced to jump from their runaway train going 50 mph.

1995
 January 31 – United Kingdom – 1995 Ais Gill rail accident: A diesel multiple unit runs into a landslip at Ais Gill, Cumbria and is derailed. Another diesel multiple unit is in collision with it. One person is killed and 30 are injured.
It strikes the "detaching hook", separating the cable from the double-deck elevator car, which falls a further . All 104 miners on board are killed. It is history's worst elevator accident.
 May 26 – United States – Two SB CSX freights collide near Flomaton, Alabama, on the former Louisville and Nashville Railroad, forcing the evacuation of dozens of Northwest Florida families. One of the derailed tank cars leaks vinyl chloride.
 June 16 – United States – Canadian Pacific 1278 boiler explosion: Gardners, Pennsylvania. A Gettysburg Railroad steam locomotive, Canadian Pacific 4-6-2 Number 1278, suffers a catastrophic boiler explosion due to low water. Three crew are seriously injured. The National Transportation Safety Board investigated, finding poor training, complacency and a general loss of the craft skills needed to operate and maintain steam. They also reported that an even more serious explosion had been averted by the fact that the locomotive was fitted with fusible plugs, a safety feature rarely found in North America but common in Europe. Major new regulation of steam locomotives followed.
 June 24 – Czech Republic – Krouna train accident: Four runaway carriages smashed into a passenger train carrying 23 people. 19 people killed, only 4 passengers survived.
 July 10 – United States – Canadian Pacific 2317: Dunmore, Pennsylvania. A Steamtown-owned steam locomotive, Canadian Pacific 4-6-2 Number 2317, was returning a nine-car excursion from Moscow to Scranton at 20 miles per hour, when it struck and killed two young boys (Paul Paskert, aged 12 and Anthony Paskert, aged 16), whom were trying to pry one of their jammed ATVs from the tracks. The excursion train did not slam the brakes, because had it did, many of the 572 passengers would've likely been injured from flying from their seats. This was the 26th excursion run since the grand opening of the new park less than a month prior.
 July 11 - United Kingdom - Largs, Scotland - A train collided with a buffer and hit a ticket office, 4 people were injured.
August 11 – Canada – 1995 Russell Hill subway accident, Toronto: A subway train collides with the stationary train ahead after a driver misinterprets a signal and the automatic train stop fails. Three people are killed, and 30 injured.
 August 20 – India – Firozabad rail disaster. A passenger train collides with another train that had stopped after it had run over a cow in Firozabad. 358 people are killed.

 October 9 – United States – Palo Verde, Arizona Derailment, Palo Verde, Arizona: Unidentified saboteurs shifted a rail out of alignment after attaching a jumper circuit, keeping the signalling circuit closed. Amtrak's Sunset Limited subsequently derailed, plunging 4 cars into a dry riverbed killing one and injuring 78 people, 12 seriously.
 October 25 – United States – 1995 Fox River Grove bus–train collision: A school bus caught between a railroad crossing and a red traffic light is hit by a Metra commuter train, killing seven students.
 October 28 – Azerbaijan – 1995 Baku Metro fire: A Baku Metro subway train catches fire between Ulduz and Nariman Narimanov stations during Saturday evening rush hour. Two hundred and eighty-nine people are killed and 265 injured. An electrical fault is blamed, but sabotage was not ruled out. The accident remains the deadliest subway disaster to date.
 December 12 - Germany - 'Garmisch-Partenkirchen train collision, In Garmisch, a Obb Train crashed into a DB Train after skipping a red light, 1 person was killed and 47 people were injured.
 December 21 – Egypt – A Cairo-Beni Sueif passenger train and Cairo-Aswan passenger train collide in dense fog, damaging many passenger cars and a locomotive in Badrasheen railroad station, killing 75 people and injuring 150.
The locomotive comes to rest in a near-vertical position leaning against the bridge, but remains coupled to the first car, suspending the car's forward end above the bridge. Only the two enginemen are killed.

1996
 January 6 – United States – Shady Grove Metrorail station, Derwood, Maryland: A Washington Metro train overruns the station platform at Shady Grove and collides with a stored train. The operator of the overrunning train is killed; the passengers on the train are uninjured.
 January 14 - Australia - Hines Hill train collision: two trains enter a passing loop from opposite directions after one of them passes a signal at danger. The engineer of one of the trains, along with one passenger, were killed.
 February 1 – United States – Cajon Pass, San Bernardino County, California: An AT&SF freight train carrying hazardous materials derails due to failed brakes in the steep pass, killing two crewmen, injuring the engineer, and shutting down Interstate 15 for several days due to a cloud of noxious fumes.
 February 9 - United States - 1996 Secaucus train collision: Two New Jersey Transit trains collided in the morning rush killing 3 people. The cause was later determined to be the colorblindness of one of the engineers involved in the accident.
 February 14 - United States - St. Paul, Minnesota - An 89-car freight train slams into 3 parked locomotives in the St. Paul Railyard due to a kink in the air hose that triggers the brakes, and 44 cars and 6 locomotives derail. Although no one was killed, nine workers are injured. This includes 36-year-old conductor Richard Vitek, who spent three hours trapped under a box car before finally being rescued and sent to the hospital.
 February 16 – United States – 1996 Maryland train collision: The engineer of a MARC commuter train bound for Washington Union Station, collides with outbound Amtrak train no. 29, the westbound Capitol Limited after the MARC crew apparently forgot an approach signal and failed to reduce speed. The crash left 3 crew and 8 passengers dead aboard the MARC train.  Three people die of injuries suffered in the impact; but the rest are killed by smoke and flames; the fire may have been ignited by oil pot switch heaters. This accident lead to the FRA instituting the Delay in Block Rule, and also was a major impetus for the Passenger Equipment Safety Standards regulation (49 CFR Part 238).

 March 4 – United States – Weyauwega, Wisconsin, derailment: A broken switch derails a Wisconsin Central train carrying liquefied petroleum gas and propane. The town of Weyauwega, Wisconsin, is evacuated as the fire burns for most of the 18-day evacuation.
 March 8 – United Kingdom – 1996 Stafford rail crash: A freight train derails due to an axle failure. A Travelling Post Office train collides with the derailed wagons. One person is killed and 22 are injured.
 April 18 – India – Gorakhpur–Gonda passenger train crashes into a stationary freight train at Domingarh station, on the outskirts of Gorakhpur, Uttar Pradesh, killing at least 60.
 April 21 – Finland – Jokela rail accident: passenger train operating in heavy fog derails at Jokela, because of overspeeding through a slow-speed turnout. The locomotive driver and three passengers were killed, and 75 were injured.
 July 2 – Ukraine – 1996 Dniprodzerzhynsk tram accident: An overcrowded tram car carrying at least 150 people derails and crashes through a concrete wall after its brakes failed while going down a steep hill. The disaster kills 34 people and injures over 100 others.
Another electric multiple unit is in a head-on collision with it. One person is killed and 69 are injured.
 September 16 – Switzerland – a passenger train collides with a locomotive at Courfaivre after passing a signal at danger. Thirty people are injured.
 September 26 – Russia – level crossing collision of a diesel locomotive into a school bus between Bataysk and Salsk in Rostov Oblast. Nineteen people killed, including 18 children. September 28 was declared national day of mourning.
 November 18 – France / United Kingdom – 1996 Channel Tunnel fire: A fire occurs on board a Eurotunnel Shuttle train inside the Channel Tunnel. Thirty-four people are injured.

1997
 January 12 – Italy – A Pendolino train derails due to excessive speed just before Piacenza station, killing 8 people and injuring 29 others.
 March 3 – Pakistan – Five coaches of a Karachi-bound train from Peshawar overturn near Khanewal after the train's brakes failed and it was driven onto a runaway track, killing 110 people and injuring 150.
 July 28 – India – Faridabad train crash, 12 people die in a collision at Faridabad in the Delhi suburbs.
 August 9 - United States - Amtrak Southwest Chief (Train Number 4) derails on a very old wooden bridge due to a severe thunderstorm in the area. No deaths were reported but 173 people were injured during the wreck.
 August 28 – China – Jilin, Changchun – In the early morning of August 28, 1997, when No. 472 passenger train from Harbin railway station to Harbin railway station pulled by DF4B diesel locomotive of Changchun locomotive depot of Shenyang Railway Bureau ran to k674 + 789m between Beijing–Harbin railway Datun and Fanjiatun, it collided with No. 3312 freight train pulled by No. 7465 locomotive of DF4C diesel locomotive, causing 36-44 freight cars behind 3312 freight trains to derail, DF4B diesel locomotive and two campers behind the locomotive derailed, resulting in four deaths, including two passengers on 472 passenger train, two drivers on 472 passenger train, and nine passengers on 472 passenger train were injured. One DF4B diesel locomotive was broken, two passenger trains were scrapped, one was broken, seven freight trains were scrapped, and the operation was interrupted for 11 hours and 50 minutes. The investigation showed that:, Two drivers of No. 3312 freight train dozed off during driving, causing the freight train to slip backward on the uphill road due to unmanned operation. In order not to be disturbed, they also shut down the train operation monitoring device installed on the locomotive without authorization, which directly caused the abnormal operation of the train to be known by the superior department in time and missed the best opportunity to avoid accidents, Then 3312 freight trains collided with 472 passenger trains, causing a major railway accident. The court heard that the main driver of No. 3312 freight train was expelled from the railway and handed over to the railway judicial authority for investigation of criminal responsibility. The deputy driver of No. 3312 freight train was expelled from the railway and kept on probation for two years. As the leading responsible person of the accident, the head of Changchun locomotive depot and the Secretary of the Party committee were both subject to administrative dismissal Several people, including the guidance driver, were punished from administrative demerit recording to administrative dismissal, and all cadres and employees of Changchun locomotive depot withheld the safety bonus of the year.
 September 8 - France - a passenger train collides with a fuel tanker on a level crossing at Port-Sainte-Foy, Dordogne, killing 13 people and injuring over 40. This remains France's worst ever level crossing accident.
 September 19 – United Kingdom – Southall rail crash, London: An inter-city train fails to stop at a red signal due to driver distraction and collides with a freight train crossing its path. 7 people are killed and 139 are injured.
 October 23 – Australia – Beresfield rail accident: coal train collides with the rear of an earlier coal train and blocks all tracks causing collisions with other trains – SPAD.
 November 13 – Switzerland – Two passenger trains collide at Appenzell. Seventeen people are injured. One of the trains had passed a signal at danger.
 December 9 – Germany – Hanover: A regional train carrying more than 300 passengers collides with a freight train consisting of 20 tanker cars filled with petrol. Five of the wrecked tankers ignite and explode. More than 90 people injured.

1998
 February 15 – Cameroon – Yaoundé train explosion: Spilt fuel oil from a tanker train crash ignited and exploded, killing more than 100 people.

 March 6 – Finland – Jyväskylä rail accident: express passenger train derails at Jyväskylä as a result of overspeeding while passing over a slow-speed turnout. The locomotive driver and nine passengers were killed, 94 people were injured.
 March 10 – United States – A BNSF train hits a school bus in Buffalo, Montana. The school bus driver stopped at the crossbuck crossing (no gates or lights) to check for a train, but a student on the bus asked the driver a question. The driver answered the question, then proceeded onto the tracks and was struck. Two students were killed and 4 others were injured.
 April 4 – India – Fatuha train crash: At least 11 people die in derailment near Patna (near Fatuha station) on the Howrah-Delhi main line as Howrah-Danapur Express derails between Fatuha and Bankaghat stations.

 June 3 – Germany – Eschede train disaster: Part of a high-speed ICE train derails at Eschede because of a faulty wheel rim and strikes a bridge. The bridge collapses as the third car hits its pylons, the remaining cars and the rear power unit jackknife into the pile. The first three carriages are separated from each other and come to a halt at Eschede railway station whilst the undamaged power car continues for another two kilometres until its brakes are automatically applied. One hundred and one people are killed. It remains the world's worst ever high-speed rail disaster.
 October 18 – Egypt – An Alexandria–Cairo passenger train crashes at Kafr el-Dawar station, Nile Delta, in an incident caused by train driver exceeding the speed limit, killing 47 people, another 104 are injured.
 November 26 – India – Khanna rail disaster: Sealdah express rams into three cars of derailed carriages of Golden Temple mail bound for Amritsar at Khanna station, on the outskirts of Ludhiana, Punjab, according to official confirmation, at least 212 people are killed.

1999

An ensuing fire sets one Superliner sleeper car ablaze. Eleven people were killed and over 100 were injured. It was subsequently determined that the truck driver had ignored the grade crossing signals and driven around the lowered gates.
 April 12 – Germany – 1999 Wuppertal Schwebebahn accident: In Wuppertal, workers doing overnight maintenance on the Schwebebahn forget to unscrew a metal clamp from the elevated monorail track.  The first train in the morning hits it, derails, and crashes into the river below, killing 5 passengers and injuring 47.
 April 23 – Canada – VIA Rail train No. 74, encountered an unexpected reversed switch, crossed over to the south main track and derailed at Thamesville, Ontario. The derailed train collided with stationary rail cars on an adjacent yard track and all four passenger cars and the locomotive of the passenger train derailed. The two train crew members in the locomotive cab were fatally injured.
 June 4 – Hungary – MÁV train No. 1973 from Tapolca to Budapest Déli Pályaudvar travelling at 78 km/h (48 mph) collides with a tree brought down across tracks by a heavy storm near Badacsonylábdihegy at 5:09 PM. Two carriages derail and the M61 004 NOHAB engine overturns and is damaged beyond repair. The remaining part of the engine stands at Tapolca station. Nobody, including driver Tamás Szűcs, is injured seriously.
 August 2 – India – Gaisal train disaster: Two express trains collide head-on. More than 285 people are killed.
 August 18 - Australia - ‘’’Zanthus train collision’’’, In Zanthus, Western Australia, an Indian Pacific Train crashed into an Nrc Train and derailed, 21 people were injured.
 October 5 – United Kingdom – Ladbroke Grove rail crash: A high-speed head-on collision between two trains occurs due to a signal passed at danger. The fuel tanks of one of the trains are destroyed and the contents are ignited by overhead power lines, causing a fireball. 31 people are killed and more than 520 injured.
 November 1 – Switzerland – Two trains collide in Bern after one of them passes a signal at danger. Two people are killed and many are injured.
 December 3 – Australia – Glenbrook rail accident, New South Wales: Stop and Proceed rule at red signal applied with insufficient care (too much speed), killing 7.
 December 30 – Canada – Mont-Saint-Hilaire, Quebec: Several tank cars filled with gasoline and heating oil from the CN freight train 703 travelling westward derailed as it was passing the CN freight train 306, travelling in the opposite direction on a parallel track. Train 306 hit the derailed wagons, which explode on impact, killing the engineer and the conductor of the 306 and starting a fire which was to burn 2.7 million liters of oil and force evacuation of 350 families within a 2-kilometer radius over the next four days.

See also
 List of accidents by death toll, category "other"
 List of road accidents – includes level crossing accidents.
 List of British rail accidents
 List of Russian rail accidents
 Years in rail transport

References

Sources

External links
 Railroad train wrecks 1907–2007

Rail accidents 1990-1999
20th-century railway accidents
Rail accidents